Pasar Minggu Station (PSM) is a railway station in Pasar Minggu, Pasar Minggu, South Jakarta. The station, which is located at an altitude of +36 meters, is included in the Operation Area I Jakarta and only serves the KRL Commuterline route.

At the front of this station, there is a new pedestrian bridge that connects the station with the Robinson department store. The pedestrian bridge is equipped with an elevator, to ease disabled people to use the pedestrian bridge. Apart from the KRL that passes at Pasar Minggu station, cement and coal transport trains also pass here.

Pasar Minggu Station now has a pedestrian tunnel to ease passengers to cross to the platform next to it. Near the Pasar Minggu Lama Station there is the PJL 19 crossing. The crossing connects the road from Condet to Tanjung Barat and Jatipadang or from the opposite direction.

Building and layout 
This station has four railway lines. Line 2 is used for a straight line towards Bogor, while line 3 is used for a straight line towards Manggarai. Lines 1 and 4 are used as turnstiles for overtaking between trains. This station has had its platform extended to accommodate the KRL series which consists of 12 train series. During the Perumka era, this station had 2 access points (the other one was on the north side), but after the platform was extended, the north access door was closed, causing access to this station only on the south side, in the main station building.

Services
The following is a list of train services at the Pasar Minggu Station

Passenger services 
 KAI Commuter

Supporting transportation

References

External links

South Jakarta
Railway stations in Jakarta